The 1961 Cornell Big Red football team was an American football team that represented Cornell University during the 1961 NCAA University Division football season. Cornell finished sixth in the Ivy League . 

In its first season under head coach Tom Harp, the team compiled a 3–6 record but outscored opponents 143 to 137. Dave McKelvey and George Telesh were the team captains. 

Cornell's 2–5 conference record placed sixth in the Ivy League standings. The Big Red were outscored 106 to 102 by Ivy opponents. 

Cornell played its home games at Schoellkopf Field in Ithaca, New York.

Schedule

References

Cornell
Cornell Big Red football seasons
Cornell Big Red football